Helvella is a genus of ascomycete fungus of the family Helvellaceae. The mushrooms, commonly known as elfin saddles, are identified by their irregularly shaped caps, fluted stems, and fuzzy undersurfaces. They are found in North America and in Europe. Well known species include the whitish H. crispa and the grey H. lacunosa. They have been reported to cause gastrointestinal symptoms when eaten raw.

Description
Species in Helvella have fruiting bodies (technically ascocarps) that grow above the ground, and usually have stems. The cup-like fruiting body (the apothecium) can assume a variety of forms: it may be shaped like an ear (auriculate), or a saddle; it may be convex or irregularly lobed and bent. The spore-bearing surface, the hymenium, can be smooth, wavy or wrinkled and can range in color from white to black or various shades of gray or brown. Similarly, the outer surface of the fruiting bodies can be smooth, ribbed, or have minute hairlike projections (villi). The stem  is cylindrical and tapering or grooved and ribbed. The flesh is usually between 1–2 mm thick.

Species
, Index Fungorum accepts 105 species of Helvella:

 Helvella acetabulum
 Helvella adhaerens
 Helvella aestivalis
 Helvella affinis
 Helvella agaricoides
 Helvella albella
 Helvella albipes
 Helvella arcto-alpina
 Helvella astieri
 Helvella aterrima
 Helvella atra
 Helvella beatonii
 Helvella branzeziana
 Helvella brevis
 Helvella brevissima
 Helvella bulbosa
 Helvella capucinoides
 Helvella chinensis
 Helvella cinerella
 Helvella compressa
 Helvella confusa
 Helvella connivens
 Helvella constricta
 Helvella corbierei
 Helvella corium
 Helvella costifera
 Helvella crassitunicata
 Helvella crispa
 Helvella cupuliformis
 Helvella dissingi
 Helvella dovrensis
 Helvella dryophila
 Helvella dura
 Helvella elastica
 Helvella engleriana
 Helvella ephippioides
 Helvella ephippium
 Helvella faulknerae
 Helvella favrei
 Helvella fibrosa
 Helvella flavida
 Helvella foetida
 Helvella fuegiana
 Helvella fusca
 Helvella galeriformis
 Helvella glutinosa
 Helvella griseoalba
 Helvella hegani
 Helvella helvellula
 Helvella hyperborea
 Helvella javanica
 Helvella jiaohensis
 Helvella jilinensis
 Helvella jimsarica
 Helvella juniperi
 Helvella lactea
 Helvella lacunosa
 Helvella latispora
 Helvella leucomelaena
 Helvella leucopus
 Helvella macropus
 Helvella maculata
 Helvella maroccana
 Helvella menzeliana
 Helvella mesatlantica
 Helvella minor
 Helvella monachella
 Helvella oblongispora
 Helvella pallidula
 Helvella papuensis
 Helvella paraphysitorquata
 Helvella pedunculata
 Helvella pezizoides
 Helvella philonotis
 Helvella phlebophora
 Helvella pileata
 Helvella platycephala
 Helvella platypodia
 Helvella pocillum
 Helvella pulchra
 Helvella quadrisulca
 Helvella queletiana
 Helvella queletii
 Helvella rivularis
 Helvella robusta
 Helvella rossica
 Helvella schaefferi
 Helvella scrobiculata
 Helvella semiobruta
 Helvella sinensis
 Helvella solida
 Helvella solitaria
 Helvella subfusispora
 Helvella subglabra
 Helvella taiyuanensis
 Helvella terrestris
 Helvella ulvinenii
 Helvella umbraculiformis
 Helvella underwoodii
 Helvella unicolor
 Helvella vacini
 Helvella verruculosa
 Helvella vespertina
 Helvella xinjiangensis
 Helvella zhongtiaoensis

See also
 Elfin saddle

References

 
Pezizales genera